Willie Vernon Murrell (September 13, 1941 – December 6, 2018) was an American professional basketball player.

Murrell was born in Taft, Oklahoma. A 6'6" forward, he played at Kansas State University from 1962 to 1964. He averaged 20.6 points and 10.7 rebounds per game during his time at Kansas State and was a 1964 All-American AP Honorable Mention. In 1964, he led Kansas State to the Final Four of the NCAA Tournament. The team was eliminated by UCLA, despite a 29-point, 13-rebound effort from Murrell. In 2009, Murrell's No. 44 jersey was retired by Kansas State.

After college, Murrell played three seasons in the American Basketball Association as a member of the Denver Rockets, Miami Floridians, and Kentucky Colonels. He averaged 13.1 points and 7.3 rebounds in 228 ABA games.

Murrell died on December 6, 2018, at age 77 in Denver, Colorado.

References

1941 births
2018 deaths
American men's basketball players
Basketball players from Oklahoma
Junior college men's basketball players in the United States
Kansas State Wildcats men's basketball players
Denver Rockets players
Kentucky Colonels players
Miami Floridians players
People from Muskogee County, Oklahoma
Scranton Miners (basketball) players
Small forwards
St. Louis Hawks draft picks